The Daimler Fifteen, was a saloon car at the low end of this manufacturer’s range, announced in September 1932. It was the first Daimler  product for more than two decades with an engine that breathed conventionally through poppet valves. Conventional valve gear had improved, superseding the former advantages of the Daimler-Knight sleeve-valve technology. The car's name derived from its tax rating of 15 hp.  The design of its 6-cylinder 1.8-litre engine was developed from the 4-cylinder 1.2-litre Lanchester Ten which was installed in Lanchester's shorter versions of the same chassis and bodies and using the same Daimler semi-automatic transmissions.

The Fifteen was the first Daimler to be offered at less than £500 since World War I. The Great Depression of the 1930s was well established and Daimler, responsible for economical BSA three-wheelers and, from 1931, the mid-price Lanchester range, went downmarket to assist sales in the austere times. Perhaps it took twenty years but this risky strategy with the Daimler name may have lost Daimler its super-luxury reputation and eventually brought about its demise.

In August 1934, in anticipation of the reduction in annual tax charge, the Fifteen was given a larger 2-litre engine. Again in August 1936 the engine was increased to 2.2-litres then another two years later to a full 2½-litres.

Pricing
 Standard chassis £350
 Six-light saloon with sliding roof £450
 Coupé £465

Design and specifications

Engine

The long-stroke engine's six cylinders and upper half of the crankcase are all in one block, like the detachable cylinder head, of cast-iron. The head carries the valves and rocker gear operated by pushrods from the chain-driven camshaft running in an oil bath within the block below. The pistons are of aluminium alloy. The crankshaft runs in four bearings and has a vibration damper.

Lubrication is fully forced including to the gudgeon pins. Cold starting conditions are provided for by splash lubrication to all vital parts. There are separate inlet and exhaust manifolds on the offside (left) with a hotspot. Cooling water circulates naturally to the radiator. A mechanical fuel pump delivers petrol from a tank at the back of the car.

Automatic engine starting is not needed as, owing to the fluid flywheel, the engine cannot be stalled in the ordinary way.

Transmission

The transmission consists of the Daimler fluid flywheel and its Wilson self-changing pre-selective, four-speed gearbox. An open propeller shaft takes the power to an underslung, worm-driven back axle.

The pre-selective finger-and-thumb lever for choosing gears is under the steering wheel and may be worked by the left hand.

Chassis
Engine, fluid flywheel and gearbox are assembled as one unit held at four points with rubber. The two back bearers are on the forward parts of the X-member of the chassis frame.

The springs are all semi-elliptic and are supplied with hydraulic shock absorbers. The springs are set wide to minimise any tendency to roll. On the radius-rod-controlled front axle they are shackled forwards, flat, splayed and held out of centre. The back springs are under the axle and outside the chassis frame.

Hydraulic four-wheel brakes by Lockheed are fitted with a vacuum servo. The frame passes below the rear springs to allow a low floor without wells within the floorboards.

The tyres on the  wheels have a section of 

Steering is by cam.

Engine upgrade for 1935
A redesigned cylinder head and an increase in cubic capacity to 2003 cc by adding 10 mm to the already lengthy stroke was claimed to have improved performance by 10% to 15%. It did not affect the tax rating of the engine. The opportunity was taken to make a number of small improvements including the provision of a water pump and thermostatic control of the coolant circulation. The top gear mechanism of the gearbox was also improved to avoid a hum when the car was idling in neutral. The complete car was now stated to weigh 25.25 cwt.

Wheels and tyres were now  wheels with a tyre section of

Facelift for 1936

The August 1935 announcement from Daimler was that the coachwork of the standard saloons was redesigned. The swept tail of the new six-light saloon now covered the spare wheel. The new bodies were appreciably wider. The special independent assembly of the radiator and front wings was applied to the Fifteen as previously applied to the new Daimler Light Twenty announced on 12 July 1935.

A number of important improvements were made to the front part of the chassis though it retained the same dimensions. Suspension and steering were changed. To reduce fore and aft movement as much as possible the front springs were lengthened and made more supple in order to bring their periodicity nearer that of the rear springs. Steering was changed to the worm and nut system. The steering column was made adjustable for reach. Centralised automatic chassis lubrication and easy jacking facilities were now installed.

Enlarged engine for 1937
Various enhancements were announced in August 1936. The principal feature was the increase in engine size from 2.003 to 2.166-litres. The rear track was widened by 1½ inches but the wheel base remained the same.

Fully chromium-plated bumpers were provided instead of the previous black and chromium edged type and the standardization of Magna type wheels with large section tyres helped the appearance of the car. The instrument board and other interior woodwork were redesigned. The windscreen was centrally controlled and was given dual wipers working from the bottom. The rear quarter windows were hinged to open. The upholstery was redesigned and could be had in all  leather or in a combination of cloth and leather. The spare wheel was covered and there was a wide range of new colour schemes.

The new range of coachwork included:
Six-window saloons with either fully panelled or leather-cloth roofs and quarters as preferred; £465
Four-window sports saloon with distinctive lines; £475
A two-door four-window four-seater coupé; £465
Chassis alone; £350

The following bodies continued to be available in addition to the standard coachwork:
Martin Walter Wingham four-door cabriolet £555
Tickford two-door cabriolet £550 by Salmons
Tickford four-door cabriolet £600 by Salmons

References

External links

Fifteen
Cars introduced in 1932
1930s cars